A spa is a therapeutic water treatment.  Related uses include:
 Day spa
 Destination spa
 Mineral spa
 Spa town, a town noted for its spa

Spa or SPA may also refer to:

Places
 Spa, Belgium, a municipality in Belgium
 Circuit de Spa-Francorchamps, a racing circuit in Spa, Belgium
 Spa, County Down, Northern Ireland
 Spa, County Kerry, a village in Ireland
 Spa Creek, a tributary of the Severn River, Annapolis, Maryland, US
 South Pole–Aitken basin (SPA), an impact crater on the far side of the moon

Art, entertainment, and media
 SPA (band), a 1990s British band 
 Spa (Sirius XM), a satellite radio music channel
 Sony Pictures Animation, an animation studio owned by Sony Pictures

Brands, enterprises, and organizations

 Saudi Press Agency
 Screen Producers Australia, film industry organization
 School of Planning and Architecture in India
 Scottish Publishers Association
 Seychelles Port Authority
 Socialist Party of America
 Socialist Party of Australia
 Socialistische Partij Anders, a Flemish Social-Democratic Party (SP.A)
 Società per azioni, S.p.A., public limited company, Italy
 Society for Popular Astronomy, UK
 Software Publishers Association, later Software and Information Industry Association
 Sony Pictures Animation, a film production company
 Spa (mineral water), a brand of Belgian mineral water
 Sudanese Professionals Association, Sudanese trade union and civic organisation
 Summer Performing Arts Company, Grand Forks, North Dakota, US
 Supreme People's Assembly, the parliament of North Korea

Computing and technology
 Secure Password Authentication
 Sense Plan Act, a robot control methodology
 Simple power analysis, a type of cryptographic attack
 Single-page application, a type of web application

Science
 Scintillation proximity assay, for biochemical development and screening
 Spathoglottis, an orchid genus

Other uses
 Spondyloarthropathy (SpA), any joint disease of the vertebral column
 S.P.A. (automobile), Società Piemontese Automobili, a car manufacturer (1908-1926)
 Special Protection Area, EU, for birds
 Volvo SPA platform, the platform created by Volvo Cars for the nomenclature of the 60 and 90 car series.
 Socrates, Plato and Aristotle (SPA), the traditional founders of Western philosophy

See also
Hot tub
Resort